Ebenavia maintimainty is a small nocturnal gecko species of the genus Ebenavia that is native to Madagascar. It is found in a small area of limestone cliffs to the east of Lake Tsimanampetsotsa on the Mahafaly Plateau. This habitat forms part of the Madagascar spiny thickets ecoregion.

References

External links
 

Ebenavia
Reptiles of the Indian Ocean
Reptiles described in 1998
Madagascar spiny thickets